Extended ML is a wide-spectrum language based on ML, covering both specification and implementation. It extends the syntax of ML to include axioms, which need not be executable but can rigorously specify the behavior of the program. With this addition the language can be used for stepwise refinement, proceeding gradually from an initial formal specification to eventually yield an executable Standard ML program. Correctness of the final executable with respect to the original specification can then be established by proving the correctness of each of the refinement steps. Extended ML is used for research into and teaching of formal program development and specification, and research into automatic program verification.

Extended ML is neither related to the programming language Extensible ML (other than being similarly derived from ML), nor to the specification language Extensible Markup Language (XML).

References
 S. Kahrs, D. Sannella and A. Tarlecki. The definition of extended ML: A gentle introduction. Theoretical Computer Science, 173(2):445–484, 28 February 1997.

External links
Don Sannella — Information about Extended ML

ML programming language family
Formal specification languages
Programming languages created in the 1980s